Anguilla bengalensis bengalensis, the Indian mottled eel, is a subspecies of eel in the genus Anguilla of the family Anguillidae. It is found throughout the Indian subcontinent and neighbouring regions including the East Indies.
 
Showing the typical characteristics of the Anguillidae, this species grows to 1.2 m and as much as 6 kg. Dorsal fin soft rays number 250–305, anal fin soft rays 220–250, vertebrae between 106 and 112 in number. They have a fecundity is about 0.33-1.72 x 10^6.

The Indian mottled eel is valued as a food fish. The mucus of this eel is used in a medicine for arthritis. It is known by numerous common names in the native languages of the regions it inhabits.

Other names
In Telugu, it is known as “Bommidayalu.” In Malayalam, it is known as "Mananjil." In Nepali, it is known as "Raj Baam." In Marathi, it is known as "Vaamb."
In Tamil, it is known as "vealangu meen".In Bengali it is known as Baam maach or Tambu maach.

References

Anguillidae
Fish of South Asia
Fish of India
Taxa named by John Edward Gray

th:ปลาสะแงะ